Luis Molina (born 7 March 1988) is an Argentine long distance runner who specialises in the marathon. He competed in the men's marathon event at the 2016 Summer Olympics.

References

External links
 

1988 births
Living people
Argentine male long-distance runners
Argentine male marathon runners
Place of birth missing (living people)
Athletes (track and field) at the 2016 Summer Olympics
Olympic athletes of Argentina
21st-century Argentine people